Queen's Bridge may mean:
 Queen's Bridge, Belfast, a bridge in Belfast, Northern Ireland
 Queen's Bridge (New Jersey), a bridge in Somerset County, New Jersey, United States
 Queens Bridge (Melbourne), a bridge in Melbourne, Victoria, Australia

See also
 Queensbridge (disambiguation)